Rikki is a given name of feminine and masculine usage. It is of European, East Asian, and South Asian origins. Notable people with the name include:
 Rikki (Japanese singer) (born 1975), Japanese folk singer
 Rikki (British singer), Scottish pop singer
 Rikki Bains (born 1988), English footballer
 Rikki Beadle-Blair (born 1961), British actor, director, screenwriter, and playwright
 Rikki Chamberlain (born 1973), British actor
 Rikki Clarke (born 1981), English cricketer
 Rikki Ducornet (born 1943), American writer, poet, and artist
 Rikki Ferguson (born 1956), Scottish professional footballer
 Rikki Fifton (born 1985), British sprinter
 Rikki Fleming (born 1946), Scottish footballer
 Rikki Fulton (1924–2004), Scottish comedian and actor
 Rikki Jai, Trinidadian chutney-soca artiste
 Rikki Klieman (born 1948), American criminal defense lawyer and television personality
 Rikki Mathay, broadcast journalist from the Philippines
 Rikki Neave (1988–1994), English male murder victim
 Rikki Poynter (born 1991), deaf American YouTuber and activist
 Rikki Rockett (born 1961), American glam metal drummer
 Rikki Sheriffe (born 1984), English rugby league player
 Rikki Wemega-Kwawu, Ghanaian artist

Fictional characters
 Rikki Barnes, a Marvel Comics character
 Rikki Chadwick, a character from Australian television series H2O: Just Add Water and supporting character in its spin-off Mako: Island of Secrets
 Rikki Nendo, a character from the Japanese mangaThe Disastrous Life of Saiki K.

See also
 King Rikki, 2002 drama film
 Ricky (disambiguation)
 Riki
 Rikki & Daz, pop music duo
 Rikki-tikki-tavi, fictional mongoose

Unisex given names